The Bloomsburg Huskies (formerly known as the Bloomsburg State Huskies) are the athletic teams that represent Bloomsburg University of Pennsylvania, located in Bloomsburg, Pennsylvania, in NCAA Division II intercollegiate sports. The Huskies are members of the Pennsylvania State Athletic Conference (PSAC) for 18 of 19 varsity sports; as the wrestling team competes in the Mid-American Conference (MAC) as a member of the NCAA's Division I. The Huskies have been a member of the PSAC since its founding in 1951.

Varsity teams

List of teams

Men's sports (9)
Baseball
Basketball
Cross country
Football
Soccer
Swimming and driving
Tennis
Track and field
Wrestling

Women's sports (10)
Basketball
Cross country
Field hockey
Lacrosse
Soccer
Softball
Swimming and diving
Tennis
Track and field
Volleyball (2018)

Individual sports

Football

In 2000, the Bloomsburg Huskies football team were the national runner-up in Division II.

Conferences
1892–1950: Independent
1951–present: Pennsylvania State Athletic Conference

Softball
The Huskies softball team won the AIAW Division III national championship in 1982.

Wrestling
The Huskies wrestling team competes in the Division I Mid-American Conference with Marcus Gordon as head coach. The Nelson Field House, located on Bloomsburg University’s upper campus, serves as home for the wrestling team's dual meets and tournaments.

National championships
The Huskies have won thirteen NCAA Division II team championships.

Team

Notable Huskies
John Willis (born 1952): American-Israeli  basketball player

Jahri Evans: Former Left Guard for the New Orleans Saints and Super Bowl XLIV champion.

Matt Feiler: Former guard for the Pittsburgh Steelers, current guard for Los Angeles Chargers.

References

External links